The Book of Us: Gravity is the fifth extended play by South Korean band Day6. It was released by JYP Entertainment on July 15, 2019.

Background and release 
Following the end of Day6's second fan meeting in Seoul, a prologue film entitled The Book of Us was released on YouTube on June 30 at midnight (KST). The EP was announced the following day with Gravity marking the beginning of the new era following the end of the Youth series in 2018. Pre-orders for the physical album opened on July 1, it will be available in two versions: "Soul" and "Mate". The track list, which contains six new tracks, was released on July 3. All members except Dowoon participated in the composition on the songs. Young K wrote all the lyrics himself except for "Cover" which he co-wrote with bandmate Sungjin. On July 5, individual "artwork images" were released every 15 minutes from midnight to 1:00 AM. Details on the physical album were revealed later that morning. Individual teaser images were released from July 6–10, followed by a group teaser image on July 11. The first music video teaser for the lead single "Time of Our Life" was released on July 12 and an album sampler was revealed the following day. The EP was released on July 15 along with the music video for "Time of Our Life".

Promotions 
Day6 held a "Comeback Live Talk" on July 15 on Naver's V LIVE broadcasting site. They held their comeback stage on Mnet's M Countdown on July 18 and promoted "Time of Our Life" on several music programs in South Korea, including Music Bank, Show! Music Core and Inkigayo.

The band promoted their new EP during their second world tour, starting in Seoul on August 9, 2019.

Track listing 
Adapted from the group's official website.

Charts

Accolades

Music programs

Release history

See also 
 List of Gaon Album Chart number ones of 2019

References 

2019 EPs
JYP Entertainment EPs
Korean-language EPs
Day6 EPs